Wedgwood is a British pottery firm founded by Josiah Wedgwood.

Wedgwood may also refer to:

Places
 Wedgwood railway station, Staffordshire, England
 Wedgwood, Seattle, neighbourhood of Seattle, Washington, United States

People with surname Wedgwood
Darwin–Wedgwood family, interrelated English families of Charles Darwin and Josiah Wedgwood, founder of the pottery firm

Josiah Wedgwood and namesake descendants
 Josiah Wedgwood, aka Josiah Wedgwood I (1730–1795), founder of the firm
 Josiah Wedgwood II (1769–1843), son of Josiah I
 Josiah Wedgwood III (1795–1880), son of Josiah II
 Josiah Wedgwood, 1st Baron Wedgwood (Josiah Wedgwood IV) (1872–1943), great-great-grandson of Josiah I 
 Josiah Wedgwood V (1899–1968), son of Josiah Wedgwood IV

Others
 Clement Wedgwood (1840–1889) partner in the pottery firm
 C. V. Wedgwood (1910–1997), English historian
 Emma Darwin, née Wedgwood, (1808–1896), wife of Charles Darwin
 Francis Wedgwood (1800-1888), partner in the pottery firm
 Hensleigh Wedgwood (1803–1891), etymologist, philologist, barrister and author
 Ivy Wedgwood (1896–1975), politician
 Sir John Wedgwood, 2nd Baronet (1907–1989), politician and industrialist
Jack Wedgwood, Australian rugby league footballer
 J. I. Wedgwood (1883–1951), Presiding Bishop of the Liberal Catholic Church
 Sir Ralph Wedgwood, 1st Baronet (1874–1956), railway executive
 Susannah Darwin, née Wedgwood, mother of Charles Darwin
Star Wedgwood, (1904–1995), ceramicist
 Thomas Wedgwood III (1685–1739),  father of Josiah Wedgwood
 Thomas Wedgwood IV (1716–1773), eldest son of Thomas III
 Thomas Wedgwood (photographer) (1771–1805), English pioneer of photography, son of Josiah Wedgwood
 Veronica Wedgwood (1910–1997), historian
 William Wedgwood Benn, 1st Viscount Stansgate (1877-1960), father of Tony Benn (formerly Sir Anthony Neil Wedgwood Benn)

Other
Wedgwood scale, an obsolete temperature scale proposed by Josiah Wedgwood I

See also
Wedgewood (disambiguation)
Jasperware